Fornicia is a genus of braconid wasps in the family Braconidae. There are more than 30 described species in Fornicia, found mainly in Asia, Africa, and the Neotropics.

Species
These 34 species belong to the genus Fornicia:

 Fornicia achterbergi Yang & Chen, 2006
 Fornicia africana Wilkinson, 1930
 Fornicia afrorum de Saeger, 1942
 Fornicia albalata Ma & Chen, 1994
 Fornicia andamanensis Sharma, 1984
 Fornicia annulipes Ashmead, 1905
 Fornicia arata (Enderlein, 1912)
 Fornicia balloui Muesebeck, 1958
 Fornicia borneana (Cushman, 1929)
 Fornicia brachymetacarpa Luo & You, 2006
 Fornicia ceylonica Wilkinson, 1928
 Fornicia chalcoscelidis Wilkinson, 1936
 Fornicia clathrata Brullé, 1846
 Fornicia ghesquierei de Saeger, 1942
 Fornicia imbecilla Chen & He, 1994
 Fornicia jarmilae Mason, 1981
 Fornicia longiantenna Luo & You, 2008
 Fornicia macistigma Luo & You, 2006
 Fornicia microcephala Granger, 1949
 Fornicia minis He & Chen, 1994
 Fornicia moronis (Cushman, 1929)
 Fornicia muluensis Austin, 1987
 Fornicia obscuripennis Fahringer, 1934
 Fornicia penang (Cushman, 1929)
 Fornicia pilosa Cushman, 1931
 Fornicia prominentis Chen & He, 1994
 Fornicia rixata Papp, 1980
 Fornicia seyrigi Granger, 1949
 Fornicia surinamensis Muesebeck, 1958
 Fornicia tagalog (Cushman, 1929)
 Fornicia tergiversata Papp, 1980
 Fornicia thoseae Wilkinson, 1930

References

Further reading

 
 
 

Microgastrinae